Debrisoquine is a derivative of guanidine.  It is an antihypertensive drug similar to guanethidine. Debrisoquine is frequently used for phenotyping the CYP2D6 enzyme, a drug-metabolizing enzyme.

See also 
 Isoquinoline#Applications of derivatives

The guanidine part of the molecule also appears in guanoxan and guanadrel.

 The 7-bromo analog of Debrisoquine is called Guanisoquin.

References 

Adrenergic release inhibitors
Antihypertensive agents
Guanidines
Tetrahydroisoquinolines